Yusef Greiss ((December 13, 1899 in Cairo, Egypt – April 7, 1961 in Venice, Italy) was an Egyptian composer of classical music, part of that nation's first generation of such composers.

Greiss was of Coptic heritage. He composed orchestral works and chamber music. His patriotic work for orchestra entitled Masr (1932) is considered the first orchestral piece composed by an Egyptian.

As of 2008, the Egyptian musicologist Haig Avakian is editing and preparing Greiss's complete works for publication.

Performance 

Solo violin and piano compositions are major parts in Greise’s compositions.

He wrote 23 solo piano compositions, 14 solo violin three solo flute, six lyrical compositions with piano, and 10 orchestra compositions.

His Works 
 
First: Solo piano compositions

 The Sudanese, 1932
 Nile Boatman, 1932
 La Galerien, 1932
 Good Luck, 1932
 A Boat Burns, 1932
 How Are You, 1932
 Truth, 1932
 Little Palestinian, 1932
 Happiness, 1932
 A Night in the Boat, 1945

Second: Solo violin compositions

 The Bedouin No. 1931 of 1932
 The Egyptian Village, No. 22 of 1932
 Dance of the Palm Valley
 Souvenir, No. 25 of 1932.
 Son of the Valley, 1943
 Bedouin Singing, 1944
 Company of the Nile, 1944
 Desert Songs, 1944
 Sphinx and Violin, 1947
 Daughter of Pyramids, 1961

Third: Violin and piano compositions

 We Dance, 1928
 Forest, 1929
 On Bank of the Nile, 1931
 The Carrier of Water, 1931
 Greetings to Vienna, 1931
 Dance of Palm Trees, 1932
 In the Desert, 1932
 Murrmering Scarabee, 1944
 Romance, 1945
 The Nile Sings, 1950

Fourth: Solo flute compositions

 Echo of the Desert, 1944
 Echo of the Valley, 1944
 Echo of the Nile, 1944

Fifth : Solo cello compositions

 The Man Peasant, 1922

Sixth : Cello and piano compositions

 The Woman Peasant, 1923

Seventh : Lyrical compositions with piano

 Song of the Valley, 1943.
 Boat of Fate, 1944
 Dance of the Nile, 1944
Song of the Shepherd, 1944
The Nile’s Song and Call, 1944
Dance of the Village, 1944

Eighth : Orchestral compositions

Egypt, Symphony, 1932
The Carrier of Water, 1932
Toward Desert Monastery, Symphony, 1934
The Nile and Rose, Symphony, 1943
Pharos’ Pyramids, Symphony, 1960

All of his composition have been published digitally by Haig Avakian.

On the Day of Art in 1981, the state honored and listed him in the Record of Immortals in the Arts Academy.

See also
List of Egyptian composers

References

External links
Yusef Greiss page

Egyptian composers
20th-century classical composers
1899 births
1961 deaths
Egyptian people of Coptic descent
Musicians from Cairo
Male classical composers
20th-century male musicians
Egyptian emigrants to Italy